Seo Jae-duck (서재덕, born July 21, 1989) is a volleyball player from South Korea, who plays as for the Men's National Team from 2009 Summer Universiade. Current, he plays as an Outside spiker for the Suwon KEPCO Vixtorm.

References

External links
 FIVB biography
 profile at FIVB.org

1989 births
Living people
South Korean men's volleyball players
Asian Games medalists in volleyball
Volleyball players at the 2014 Asian Games
Volleyball players at the 2018 Asian Games
Sungkyunkwan University alumni
Place of birth missing (living people)
Asian Games silver medalists for South Korea
Asian Games bronze medalists for South Korea
Medalists at the 2014 Asian Games
Medalists at the 2018 Asian Games
Sportspeople from Gwangju
21st-century South Korean people